Peter Norie Tennant (17 April 1942 – 23 June 2016) was an English cricketer.  Tennant was a right-handed batsman who fielded as a wicket-keeper.  He was born at Sutton Coldfield, Warwickshire.

Tennant made a single first-class appearance for Warwickshire County Cricket Club against Scotland at Edgbaston in 1964.  He was not required to bat during the match, but behind the stumps he took 3 catches and made a single stumping.  This was his only major appearance for Warwickshire.

He died in June 2016 at the age of 74.

References

External links

1942 births
2016 deaths
Cricketers from Sutton Coldfield
English cricketers
Warwickshire cricketers
Wicket-keepers